Artyom Ilyich Shvets-Rogovoy (born March 3, 1995) is a Russian ice hockey forward currently playing for SKA Saint Petersburg of the Kontinental Hockey League (KHL).

Career statistics

Regular season and playoffs

International

References

External links

1995 births
Living people
SKA Saint Petersburg players
HC Vityaz  players
THK Tver  players
Sportspeople from Saratov
Russian ice hockey centres